Jayaratne is a Sinhalese surname. Notable people with the surname include:

 Ajit Jayaratne, Sri Lankan businessman
 Anuradha Jayaratne (born 1985), Sri Lankan politician
 D. M. Jayaratne (1931–2019), Sri Lankan politician
 Ishan Jayaratne (born 1989), Sri Lankan cricketer
 Jayantha de S. Jayaratne, Sri Lankan army officer
 Osmund Jayaratne (died 2006), Sri Lankan academic and politician
 Piyankara Jayaratne (born 1964), Sri Lankan politician
 T. M. Jayaratne (born 1944), Sri Lankan singer
 Tilak Jayaratne (1943–2012), Sri Lankan broadcaster
sayuri jayarathne -model (20022.05.13)

See also
 

Sinhalese surnames